Cáceres or Caceres is a Spanish surname. People with the surname include:

 Caceres family, a Jewish family
 Adrian Caceres (born 1982), Argentine-born Australian football player
 Alex Caceres (born 1988), American mixed martial artist
 Alexia Cáceres (born 1995), Paraguayan handball player
 Alonso de Escobar y Cáceres (16th Century), Spanish military
 Andrés Avelino Cáceres (1833–1923), President of Peru
 Adrian Caceres (born 1982), Argentine-born Australian football player
 Anthony Caceres (born 1992), Australian football player
 Antony Caceres (born 2000), Canadian soccer player
 Atilio Cáceres (born 1981), Paraguayan football player
 Berta Cáceres (1970s–2016), Honduran environmental activist
 Blas Cáceres (born 1990), Paraguayan football player
 Blazco Múñoz de Cáceres Spanish nobleman
 Carlos Arturo Cáceres (born 1977), Chilean football player
 Carlos Gamarra Cáceres (1948–2005), Paraguayan chess master
 Carlos Navarrete Cáceres (born 1931), Guatemalan anthropologist and writer
 Catalina Cáceres (born 1990), Chilean model and beauty pageant titleholder
 César Cáceres Cañete (born 1977), Paraguayan football player
 Daniel Cáceres Silva (born 1982), Paraguayan football player
 Darío Cáceres (born 1998), Paraguayan football player
 Delfín Benítez Cáceres (1910–2004), Paraguayan football player
 Diego de Cáceres y Ovando, Spanish nobleman
 Domingo Pérez Cáceres (1892-1961), Spanish ecclesiastic, Bishop of San Cristóbal de La Laguna
 Édgar Barreto (born 1984), Paraguayan football player
 Edgar Cáceres (born 1964), Venezuelan baseball player
 Eduardo Cáceres, Vice President of Guatemala, 1970-74
 Emilio Bobadilla Cáceres (born 1907), Paraguayan songwriter
 Ernie Caceres (1911–1971), American jazz saxophonist
 Enrique Cáceres (born 1974), Paraguayan football referee
 Esther de Cáceres (1903–1971), Uruguayan poet and writer
 Eusebio Cáceres (born 1991), Spanish athlete 
 Fernán Blázquez de Cáceres (14th century), Spanish nobleman, son of Juan Blázquez
 Fernando Cáceres (born 1969), Argentine football player
 Francisco Caceres, TV host and producer
 Raulo Cáceres (born 1976), Spanish comic artist
 Ignacio Cáceres (born 1976), Spanish long-distance runner
 Javier Caceres (footballer) (born 1939), Peruvian football player
 Javier Caceres (sport shooter) (born 1919), Peruvian sport shooter
 Jorge Cáceres (pentathlete) (1917–1975), Argentine pentathlete
 Jorge Cáceres (poet) (1923–1949), Chilean poet, painter and dancer
 Jorge Luis Cáceres (born 1982), Ecuadorian writer, editor, and anthologist
 Jorge Ramón Cáceres (born 1948), Argentine football player
 Jorge Suárez Cáceres (born 1976), Puerto Rican politician
 José Miguel Cáceres (born 1981), Dominican volleyball player
 José Núñez de Cáceres (1772–1846), Dominican politician and writer
 Juan Blázquez de Cáceres, Spanish soldier and nobleman
 Juan de Cáceres y Ulloa (1618–1682), Spanish nobleman and musician
 Juan Daniel Cáceres (born 1973), Paraguayan football player
 Juan Cáceres (footballer, born 1949) (born 1949), Peruvian football player
 Juan Cáceres (racing driver) (born 1984), Uruguayan racing driver
 Juan Carlos Cáceres (1936–2015), Argentine musician
 Juan Francisco Cáceres (born 1962), Mexican politician
 Juan Ignacio Cáceres (born 1992), Argentine sprint canoeist
 Julio César Cáceres (born 1979), Paraguayan football player
 Kurt Caceres (born 1972), American actor
 Leticia Cáceres (born 1978), Australian stage and film director
 Luciano Cáceres, Argentine actor
 Luis Cáceres (footballer) (born 1988),Paraguayan football player
 Manuel Altagracia Cáceres (1838–1878), Dominican politician
 Miguel Ángel Cáceres (born 1978), Paraguayan football player
 Marcos Cáceres (born 1986), Paraguayan football player
 Mario Cáceres (born 1981), Chilean football player 
 Martín Cáceres (born 1987), Uruguayan football player
 Miguel Ángel Peña Cáceres (born 1970), Spanish racing cyclist
 Oscar Caceres (born 1932), Peruvian sports shooter
 Pablo Caballero Cáceres (born 1972), Paraguayan  football player and manager
 Pablo Cáceres Rodríguez (born 1985), Uruguayan football player
 Pablo Montesino Cáceres (1781–1849), Spanish teacher and academic
 Pedro Cáceres (born 1960), Argentine middle-distance runner
 Ramón Cáceres (1866–1911), 31st president of the Dominican Republic
 Raphaël Cacérès (born 1987), French football player
 Raúl Cáceres (born 1991), Paraguayan football player 
 Richard Caceres (born 1982), Paraguayan football player
 Roberto Reinaldo Cáceres González (1921–2019), Uruguayan Prelate of Roman Catholic Church
 Rosa Mirambell i Càceres (born 1933), Catalan painter and engraver
 Rubén Nuñez de Cáceres, founder/director of the Center for Human Values of the Tec de Monterrey, Campus Tampico
 Samuel Cáceres (born 1989), Paraguayan football player
 Vesna Cáceres (born 1971), Czech composer, singer and accordionist
 Vicente Cáceres (born 1967), Spanish wrestler
 Víctor Cáceres (born 1985), Paraguayan football player
 Virginio Cáceres (born 1962), a Parguayan football player
 Bertha Zúñiga Cáceres (born 1990), Hondurigen social activist

See also
Cáceres (disambiguation)
 Bartomeu Càrceres (fl.1546), Catalan composer of ensaladas

Spanish-language surnames